Rudolph Fischer (September 17, 1923 – February 18, 2016) was a Romanian historian and linguist.

References

1923 births
2016 deaths
People from Brașov
Transylvanian Saxon people
Romanian people of Hungarian-Jewish descent
20th-century Romanian historians